Cymolomia phaeopelta is a moth of the family Tortricidae. It is found in Vietnam, Thailand, India, western Java and eastern Borneo.

References

Moths described in 1921
Olethreutini
Moths of Asia
Moths of Indonesia
Insects of Borneo
Taxa named by Edward Meyrick